The United States District Court for the District of Montana (in case citations, D. Mont.) is the United States District Court whose jurisdiction is the state of Montana (except the part of the state within Yellowstone National Park, which is under the jurisdiction of the United States District Court for the District of Wyoming).  The court is located in Billings, Butte, Great Falls, Helena and Missoula.

Cases from the District of Montana are appealed to the United States Court of Appeals for the Ninth Circuit (except for patent claims and claims against the U.S. government under the Tucker Act, which are appealed to the Federal Circuit).

The United States Attorney's Office for the District of Montana represents the United States in civil and criminal litigation in the court.

History
The District of Montana was organized on February 22, 1889, by 25 Stat. 676, following Montana's admission to statehood. Congress organized Montana as a single judicial district, and authorized one judgeship for the district court, which was assigned to the Ninth Circuit. A temporary second judgeship was added on September 14, 1922, by 42 Stat. 837, and was made permanent on May 31, 1938, by 52 Stat. 584. On July 10, 1984, by 98 Stat. 333, the third judgeship was authorized.

Current judges
:

Vacancies and pending nominations

Former judges

Chief judges

Succession of seats

See also
 Courts of Montana
 List of current United States district judges
 List of United States federal courthouses in Montana
 United States Court of Appeals for the Ninth Circuit

References

External links
 United States District Court for the District of Montana Official Website
 United States Attorney for the District of Montana Official Website
 U.S. District Court of Montana, Legislative history, Federal Judicial Center.

Montana
Montana law
Billings, Montana
Butte, Montana
Great Falls, Montana
Helena, Montana
Missoula, Montana
1889 establishments in Montana
Courthouses in Montana
Courts and tribunals established in 1889